Guo Yan (born June 24, 1982 in Beijing, China) is a Chinese table tennis player. Two-time winner of World Cup in 2006 and 2010. In February 2011, she ranked 2nd in the ITTF world ranking.

Career records
Singles (as of February 3, 2011)
World Championships: runner-up (2005); SF (2007)
World Cup: winner (2006, 10); runner-up (2005)
Pro Tour winner (4): Croatian, Swedish Open 2001; Korea Open 2003; English Open 2009. Runner-up (15): China (Hainan) Open 2001; Polish Open 2002; China (Guangzhou), Japan Open 2003; German Open 2004; Japan Open 2005; Japan Open 2006; Japan, China (Nanjing), Austria, Swedish Open 2007; Qatar, Korea, Singapore Open 2008; English Open 2011
Pro Tour Grand Finals appearances: 7. Record: winner (2008, 09); SF (2001, 02, 03, 07).
Asian Championships: SF (2007)
Asian Cup: 1st (2005, 2011)

Women's doubles
World Championships: runner-up (2009); SF (2005)
Pro Tour winner (7): Korea Open 2002; China (Harbin) Open 2005; Slovenian, China (Shenzhen), French Open 2007; Kuwait Open 2010; English Open 2011 Runner-up (8): Swedish Open 2001; China (Guangzhou), Japan Open 2003; Greek, German Open 2004; Kuwait Open 2007; English, Polish Open 2009
Asian Games: SF (2002)

Mixed doubles
World Championships: SF (2005)
Asian Games: winner (2010)
Asian Championships: SF (2003)

Team
World Championships: 1st (2006, 08); 2nd (2010)
World Team Cup: 1st (2010)
Asian Games: 1st (2006, 10); 2nd (2002)
Asian Championships: 1st (2003, 2007)

References

External links 
Career profile of Guo Yan - Table Tennis Master

1982 births
Living people
Chinese female table tennis players
Asian Games medalists in table tennis
Table tennis players from Beijing
Table tennis players at the 2002 Asian Games
Table tennis players at the 2006 Asian Games
Table tennis players at the 2010 Asian Games
Medalists at the 2002 Asian Games
Medalists at the 2006 Asian Games
Medalists at the 2010 Asian Games
Asian Games gold medalists for China
Asian Games silver medalists for China
Asian Games bronze medalists for China
World Table Tennis Championships medalists